The Kerr City Historic District is a U.S. Historic District (designated as such on September 29, 1995) located east of Fort McCoy, Florida. The district is south of CR 316, and north of Lake Kerr. It contains 17 buildings and 1 structure.

Gallery

See also

 National Register of Historic Places listings in Marion County, Florida

References

External links

 Marion County listings at National Register of Historic Places

National Register of Historic Places in Marion County, Florida
Historic districts on the National Register of Historic Places in Florida